The U.S. state of Iowa first required its residents to register their motor vehicles in 1904. Registrants provided their own license plates for display until 1911, when the state began to issue plates.

Plates are currently issued by the Iowa Department of Transportation through its Motor Vehicle Division. Front and rear plates are required for most classes of vehicles, while only rear plates are required for motorcycles, trailers and the 1945 base plate.

Passenger baseplates

Prestate

1911 to 1971
The 1955 (dated 1956) issue was the first Iowa license plate that complied with these standards.

1972 to present

County coding

Current non-passenger and optional plates

Non-passenger plates

Optional plates
Iowa offers its motorists a number of optional issue designs that are available upon the payment of an additional fee.

Plates of all types other than the university types are available for both automobiles and motorcycles, the latter using a smaller overall plate size. University Plates are the only plates not colored the same as the standard issue plate, the color scheme is a yellow base, with the university's main sports team color on both the numbers, and a header denoting the school (i.e. red for Iowa State University, black for University of Iowa, purple for UNI, et cetera).

Previous non-passenger and optional plates

Optional plates

Sesquicentennial plates

References

External links
Iowa license plates, 1969–present

Iowa
Transportation in Iowa
Iowa transportation-related lists